Eukaryotic translation initiation factor 4E transporter is a protein that in humans is encoded by the EIF4ENIF1 gene.

The protein encoded by this gene is a nucleocytoplasmic shuttle protein for the translation initiation factor eIF4E. This shuttle protein interacts with the importin alpha-beta complex to mediate nuclear import of eIF4E. It is predominantly cytoplasmic;its own nuclear import is regulated by a nuclear localization signal and nuclear export signals.

Interactions
EIF4ENIF1 has been shown to interact with EIF4E.

References

Further reading